General Wynyard may refer to:

Edward Buckley Wynyard (1788–1864) was a British Army general
Henry Wynyard (1761–1838), British Army general
John Wynyard (died 1752), British Army lieutenant general
William Wynyard (British Army officer) (1759–1819), British Army lieutenant general